USS Abner Read has been the name of more than one United States Navy ship, and may refer to:

 , a  commissioned in 1943 and sunk in 1944
 , a  laid down during World War II but cancelled during construction in September 1946 and scrapped on the building ways

United States Navy ship names